The 2011–12 Caribbean Twenty20 was the third season of the Caribbean Twenty20, a domestic T20 tournament administered by the West Indies Cricket Board. The opening match was held on 9 January 2012, and the final was played at Kensington Oval, Barbados on 22 January 2012. The national teams of Canada and Netherlands in addition to Sussex participated as the overseas teams. There were ten teams as it was in the 2010–11 tournament.

Trinidad and Tobago won the tournament and, as the best performing domestic team, qualified for the 2012 Champions League Twenty20 (qualifying stage).

Venues 
Queen's Park Oval in Trinidad and Tobago was initially a venue for some of the preliminary matches, but eventually was cancelled due to nonavailability of the ground on 4 January. All matches were played at the following two grounds:

Format
The format was the same as it was in 2010–11. The tournament consisted of 24 matches, divided into a group stage and a knockout stage. The group stage had the teams divided into two equal groups, with each playing a round-robin tournament. The top two teams of each group advanced to the knockout stage. The knockout stage consisted of two semi-finals, a third-place playoff and the grand final. The semi-finals had the top team of one group facing the second from the other. The winners of the semi-finals played the grand final to determine the winner of the competition, while the losers of the semi-finals played the third-place playoff.

Points in the group stage were awarded as follows:

Teams 
The following ten teams participated in the tournament:

Group A
 †
 
  Leeward Islands
 
  Windward Islands

Group B
 
  Combined Campuses and Colleges
 
 †
  Sussex†

†Invited overseas team

Results

Group stage

Group A

Group B

Knockout stage

Fixtures
All times shown are in Eastern Caribbean Time (UTC−04).

Group stage

Group A

Group B

Knockout stage
Semi-finals

Third-place playoff

Final

References

External links
Official Caribbean T20 website
CricInfo Caribbean T20 2011/12 website

C
Caribbean Twenty20
2011–12 West Indian cricket season
Caribbean Twenty20